The 2022 Pennsylvania state elections took place on November 8, 2022. On that date, the Commonwealth of Pennsylvania held elections for the following offices: Governor and Lieutenant Governor (on one ticket), U.S. Senate, U.S. House of Representatives, Pennsylvania State Senate, Pennsylvania House of Representatives, and various others.

Redistricting 

Following the 2020 Census, Pennsylvania's congressional, State Senate, and State House districts will all be redrawn. Summary 2020 census data released by the United States Census Bureau in April 2021 announced that Pennsylvania will lose one congressional seat.

United States Senate 

Incumbent Republican Senator Pat Toomey announced he would retire at the end of his term and not seek re-election in 2022. Democratic Lieutenant Governor John Fetterman defeated Republican nominee celebrity doctor Mehmet Oz in the general election, making it the only Senate seat to change party control in 2022.

United States House of Representatives 

The general election will be held on November 8.  Following the 2020 Census, reapportionment led to Pennsylvania's House delegation shrinking from 18 seats to 17 seats; redistricting will determine the new district lines.

Governor & Lt. Governor 

Incumbent Democratic Governor Tom Wolf is term-limited and cannot seek re-election to a third term. Lt. Governor John Fetterman is eligible for re-election to a second term, but is instead running for US Senate. The Democratic ticket of state Attorney General Josh Shapiro and State Representative Austin Davis defeated the Republican ticket of State Senator Doug Mastriano and State Representative Carrie DelRosso.

Pennsylvania State Senate 

Twenty-five of 50 seats (even-numbered districts) in the Pennsylvania Senate are up for election in Pennsylvania's general election.

Pennsylvania House of Representatives 

All 203 seats in the Pennsylvania House of Representatives are up for election in the general election.

Municipal Elections 

Five Philadelphia City Council seats will be up for election in Pennsylvania's general election due to resignations from the incumbents to run for Mayor.

Pennsylvania ballot measures 
No statewide ballot measures were on the ballot in 2022.

See also 

 Elections in Pennsylvania
 Electoral reform in Pennsylvania
 Bilingual elections requirement for Pennsylvania (per Voting Rights Act Amendments of 2006)
 Political party strength in Pennsylvania
 Politics of Pennsylvania

References 

Pennsylvania elections
 
Pennsylvania